Chingsubam Akaba (9 November 1944 - 1 January 2007) was a Meetei Sanamahist revivalist.

Social activities 
Akaba was the founding president of MEELAL. He established MEELAL on 18 August 2003 in order to aid the Meetei Mayek movement. MEELAL observes 18 May every year as the Mayek Chatpa Numit to mark the publication of a white paper on the issue of scripts by the State Government on 18 May 2005, which led to introduction of Meetei Mayek in the school syllabus from class I to X in 2006.

Politics
He founded Meetei National Front in 1979 on the 23rd Day of  Wakching (December). Oja Akaba joined the Manipur People's Party (MPP) for the 2007 general election in the state of Manipur.

Death
Oja Akaba was shot at point blank range near the gate of his house at the midnight of 31 December 2006.The incident happened when he went out to see off his driver after attending a musical concert at Palace Compound on 31st December night 2006. He was dropped at his residence at Soibam Leikai by his driver at 12:10 am. The driver saw two unidentified people shoot him twice.

References

External links
 https://www.ifp.co.in/page/items/29161/unity-of-hill-and-valley-stressed-upon-during-71st-birth-anniversary-of-chingsubam-akaba/

Sanamahist leaders
Sanamahists
1944 births
People from Imphal West district
Meitei people
Scholars from Manipur
2007 deaths